Calus may refer to:

 Căluș, a traditional Romanian dance
 Čālūs, a city in Mazandaran, Iran
 Čālūs River, a river in Mazandaran, Iran
 An enemy boss in the Destiny 2 campaign

See also 

 Callus (disambiguation)
 Chalus (disambiguation)